Ahrén is an Old Swedish surname.  Notable people with the surname include:

Nils Ahrén (1877–1928), Swedish silent film actor
Per-Olov Ahrén (1926–2004), Swedish clergyman
Uno Åhrén (1897–1977), Swedish architect and city planner

See also
Ahrens (disambiguation)

Swedish-language surnames